Ælfwig (died 1066), was the abbot of New Minster, the uncle of Harold, and was probably the brother of Earl Godwine.

Ælfwig was made abbot in 1063. When Harold marched to meet the Normans, Ælfwig joined him with twelve of his monks, wearing coats of mail over their monastic garb, and with twenty armed men. He and his monks fell fighting at Senlac. After the battle their bodies were recognised by the habit of their order, which was seen beneath their armour. The Conqueror punished the convent severely for the part which it had taken in resisting his invasion.

References

External links
 

1066 deaths
English abbots
11th-century English clergy
Year of birth unknown